La Academia (The Academy) is a Mexican reality musical talent television series shown on Azteca, that premiered in June 2002 and is currently in its thirteenth installment. Although the show itself is not affiliated with the Endemol franchise, which includes the "Star Academy" shows, it does share the competition format of many of the variants of the global franchise.

Over the first seasons, the show was a reliable dominator of its time-slot, which was shown by its triumph over Televisa's Operación Triunfo Mexico, in several countries including Chile, Peru and Venezuela. The rival show was only produced for one season, and was in fact the official Endemol entry in Mexico. The last seasons of La Academia had declining ratings, being aired against the Mexican version of The Voice, produced by Televisa, and it eventually ceased production in 2012. However, in 2018, Azteca rebooted the franchise and it aired a new generation of La Academia which received positive reviews from critics and saw an impressive increase in total viewership.

The show has been franchised to other countries: Azerbaijan (Akademiya), Malaysia (Akademi Fantasia), Indonesia (Akademi Fantasi Indosiar), United States (La Academia USA), Paraguay (La Academia Paraguay), Singapore (Sunsilk Academy Fantasia), Thailand (True Academy Fantasia), Central America (La Academia Centroamérica) and Greece (House of Fame).

Format
Each year, 14–49 people are selected to live together in a house isolated from the rest of the world, spending their days taking classes in singing, dancing, acting, and related fields, each preparing one or two songs for a 3-hour concert which they give each Sunday evening for TV viewers and a live studio audience.  Each week, one of the contestants is eliminated based on the number of votes each one receives, until 4 to 10 students become the finalists and compete for the top prize. Viewers can vote by telephone, text or online. 
Camino a la Fama aired during weekday afternoons, but it was cancelled after The Ninth Generation. This show taped what the students' lives within the La Academia house. It also demonstrated the singing, dancing, and acting classes.

Series overview

Notes

  In the first and second series, the judges' panel rotated between different music experts every week, regular guests are listed.
  During the eighth series, several guest judges served as temporary replacement for Olga Tañón, such as: Marta Sánchez, Mónica Naranjo, María Conchita Alonso, Elvis Crespo, Tatiana, Dulce, Los Horóscopos de Durango, Gabriela Spanic, Eduardo Capetillo, and Bibi Gaytán
  Paolo is considered the winner of the Judges' International Prize.
  Myriam joined the judges' panel on Concert 5.

Main Generations

Season 1: The First Generation (2002)

La Academia began on 7 July 2002. Fourteen were selected to be part of The First Generation, and Alan Tacher was selected to host. The National Auditorium in Mexico City served as the setting for the final concert, where the winner received a Coca-Cola touring contract, a worldwide trip, a brand new Chevrolet Trail Blazer and the top prize: MX$2.5 million and a recording contract.

Miguel Ángel, Myriam, Nadia, Víctor and Yahir reached the finale held on 1 December 2002. Myriam Montemayor Cruz was declared the winner of La Academia.

Season 2: The Second Generation (2002–03)

The Second Generation was presented at the final concert of The First Generation on 1 December 2002. Once again, the National Auditorium in Mexico City served as the setting for the final concert, where the winner received the top prize of MX$2.5 million and a recording contract.

Freddi, Manuel, Marco, Rosalía and Érika reached the finale held on 30 March 2003. Érika Alcocer Luna was declared the second winner of La Academia.

Season 3: The Third Generation (2004)

A year after the end of The Second Generation, The Third Generation, with far more production than before, began on 14 March 2004. The Teotihuacan Hall in Acapulco served as the setting for the final concert, where the winner received a brand new car and a larger top prize of MX$3 million and a recording contract.

This Season was the first to had a permanent judging panel.

Dulce, Melissa, César, Lety Lopez, Carlos and Israel reached the finale held on 4 July 2004. Carlos Rivera Guerra was declared the third winner of La Academia.

Season 4: The Fourth Generation (2005)

Almost a year after the start of The Third Generation, The Fourth Generation began on 27 February 2005. The Monterrey Arena in Monterrey served as the setting for the final concert, where the winner received the newly raised top prize of MX$3.5 million and a recording contract.

The Fourth Season was highly controversial, with conflicts between contestant Jolette Hernández and members of the judge panel as the main source of controversy. The final results were also controversial, as frontrunner Yuridia placed second at the grand finale.

Yuridia, Adrian, Cynthia, Erasmo, Edgar and Silvia reached the finale held on 3 July 2005. Yuridia Gaxiola Flores was declared the fourth winner of La Academia.

Season 5: The Light Generation (2006)

The Light Generation began on 9 July 2006, where the fewest contestants, four, became finalists. The boardwalk of the Port of Veracruz in Veracruz served as the setting for the final, and first open-air, concert, where the winner received the top prize of MX$3 million and a recording contract.

This was the first season hosted by a female with Monica Garza.

Colette, Renata, Samuel and Marbella reached the finale held on 17 December 2006. Samuel Castelli Marini was declared the fifth winner of La Academia.

Season 6: The Last Generation (2008)

The Last Generation began on 31 August 2008. The Víctor Manuel Reyna Stadium in Tuxtla Gutiérrez, Chiapas served as the setting for the final concert, where the winner received the top prize of MX$3 million, a recording contract and the new La Academia Trophy.

Perla, María Fernada, Fabiola, Luis Armando and Valeria reached the finale held on 12 December 2008. María Fernanda Alvo Díaz was declared the sixth winner of La Academia.

Later Maria Fernanda, Valeria, Perla, Jackie, Fatima and Alex formed a girl group called G6; Fabiola Rodas won the third season of Desafio de Estrelas a year later.

Season 7: The New Generation (2009)

The New Generation was renewed due to the popular demand  and led by the most outspoken critic, Lolita Cortés, beginning on 4 October 2009. This season featured 36 contestants, and seven, became finalists. The Víctor Manuel Reyna Stadium in Tuxtla Gutiérrez, Chiapas once again served as the setting for the final concert, where the winner received the lowest top prize of MX$1 million and a recording contract.

Agustín, Oscar, Fabiola, Sebastián, Menny, Giovanna and Napoleón reached the finale held on 20 December 2009. Giovanna Nicole Paz was declared the seventh winner of La Academia.

*Jesús Antonio Guerrero is Daniel Solís's real birth name and 47 was his real age when he was expelled

Season 8: The Bicentennial Generation (2010)

Bicentennial Generation was the name given to this season in honor of the 200 years of Mexican independence. It began on 12 September 2010, featuring 49 contestants, and 10 finalists, marking an all-time high for the series. The Víctor Manuel Reyna Stadium in Tuxtla Gutiérrez, Chiapas, served as the setting for the finale for a third time. For the first time ever, two winners were announced: one was chosen by the panel of critics as well as Lolita Cortés and La Academia teachers, winning the International Prize of US$20,000; the other was chosen by the viewers, winning La Academia: Bicentenario and MX$1 million.

Luis, Eri, Gerardo, Esmeralda, Carolina, Johnny, Daniel, Edgar, Paolo and Edu reached the finale held on 19 December 2010. Esmeralda Ugalde Mota was declared the eighth winner of La Academia. Paolo Ragone won the first and only International Prize.

* Winner of the International Prize

Season 9: 2011 Generation (2011)

La Academia 2011 premiered on 21 August 2011, and it was the first reality show to be aired in 3D. It featured 35 contestants. The season was led by Eduardo Capetillo, and hosted by his wife Bibi Gaytán accompanied by Rafael Araneda. During the middle of the competition, on 26 October, Eduardo Capetillo announced to the contestants that Magda Rodriguez was no longer the producer (she was fired due to low ratings). Juan Navarrete became the new producer. At the end of the 11th. Concert, Eduardo Capetillo announced that he would look for new contestants to join the competition. On the 12th. and 13th. Concert, 6 new contestants (Cecilia, Dianela, Héctor, Valeria, Alfonso, Gaby) were brought to the competition. After involving La Academia on a personal matter, Eduardo Capetillo and Bibi Gaytán were fired on 7 December 2011, 2 weeks before the finale. It was announced Julio Preciado would take his place as principal for the remaining weeks of the competition and Ingrid Coronado will return to host the semifinal and finale. The finale was held on 18 December, once again in Víctor Manuel Reyna Stadium in Tuxtla Gutiérrez, Chiapas. The winner received MX$500,000 in addition to the cash prize accumulated over the course of the competition and a recording contract.

Emanuel, Cecilia, Gustavo, Ronald, Gil, Yanilen, Erick, Hancer, Pablo & Carmen reached the finale. Erick Sandoval was declared the ninth winner of La Academia.

* The specific rank wasn't revealed, but the contestants are listed in order of elimination

Season 10: The Decade Generation (2012)

The Decade Generation premiered on 26 August 2012, celebrating the tenth anniversary of La Academia. Fernando De Solar and his wife Ingrid Coronado were introduced as the new hosts of La Academia. On 16 August, it was confirmed that the four judges will be Marta Sánchez, Julio Preciado, Cruz Martínez and First Generations fourth place, Yahir. Chacho Gaytán, serve as the Principal of this generation. In this season, the contestants were no longer isolated as they could use the social media to keep in touch with fans and family. On 16 September, the winner of The First Generation, Myriam, joined the judges panel. The finale was held on 16 December, in Tuxtla Gutiérrez, Chiapas. The Polyforum Chiapas, served for the first time as the setting of the final concert. The winner received a Recording Contract and MX$1,000,000.

Alexis, Chucho, Manuel, Rubí, Santana & Selene reached the finale. Alexis Montoya was declared the tenth winner of La Academia.

Reboot Generations

Season 11 (2018)

Season 11 premiered on 8 July 2018, as TV Azteca's celebration of its twenty-five year anniversary. This generation serves as the return of one of its most successful formats, according to statements by the content director, Alberto Ciurana. On 14 May, it was announced that Adal Ramones would return to the small screen as the host of La Academia, after joining TV Azteca almost three years after leaving their competitor, Televisa. On 4 July 2018, the names of the contestants and teachers of the new season of La Academia were revealed through social media accounts of the reality show, which will be led by Héctor Martínez, the principal of the First Generation of the show. Later that day, it was announced that the new panel of judges will be formed by Arturo López Gavito, Horacio Villalobos, Edwin Luna and Edith Márquez. The finale was held on 7 October, in which the winner received a recording contract and MX$1,000,000.

Katheryn, Dalia, Alexis, Paola & Silvia reached the finale. Paola Chuc was declared the eleventh winner of La Academia.

Season 12 (2019–20)

On 23 October 2019, Television Azteca held a special ceremony to reveal details about the upcoming season of its most successful show. Horacio Villalobos and Arturo López Gavito will seat again at the judges' table and they will be joined by Remmy Valenzuela (who was let go after the first concert), Alexander Acha and Danna Paola. 
For the first time, the reality show will have a prestigious artist who will become "the voice of experience" and work as a mentor for the contestants. This task will pertain to the Chilean singer and songwriter Beto Cuevas, who explained that it will take them out of their comfort zone.
During the presentation, Adal Ramones and Cynthia Rodríguez also presented the principal of La Academia, which will again be Héctor Martínez, and the teaching staff will be Alan Benabib, Beto Castillo, Guille Gómez, Lula Ross, Jorge Romano, Raúl Carballeda, Rodrigo Cachero and Rosa Virgen. In addition, Chacho Gaytán will be in charge of the musical direction of the show.  The finale was held on 23 February, in which the winner received a recording contract and MX$1,000,000.

Angie, Dalú, Carlos, Charly & Dennis reached the finale. Dalú was declared the twelfth winner of La Academia.

Season 13 (2022)

La Academia will commemorate its 20th anniversary with a new season in 2022. On 9 May 2022, it was announced that Lolita Cortés and Arturo López Gavito will once again share the judges' panel. The season will also have Horacio Villalobos and popular singer, Ana Bárbara critiquing the students' performance every Saturday and Sunday. As part of the 20 year celebration, First Generation's Yahir will serve as the main host with Vanessa Claudio as co-host, who will be replacing Adal Ramones and Cynthia Rodriguez.
Alexander Acha will act as the principal of the new season, while Aleks Syntek will step in as their mentor.

Andres, Cesia, Nelson, Rubí & Mar reached the finale. Cesia was declared the thirteenth winner of La Academia.

Spin-off Generations

USA: Season 1 (2005–06)

La Academia USA is the first musical reality show with only Hispanic contestants launched by Azteca America in October 2005. The auditions were done nationwide and the first La Academia USA concert was on 20 November 2005.

After three months of competition La Academia USA came to an end, crowning Mariana Vargas as winner of the Latin Reality Show. As the winner and runner-up, Mariana and Gustavo respectively received contracts with Warner Music for the release of an album.

C.A: Season 1 (2013)

KIDS: Season 1 (2013)

La Academia Kids was presented in 2010 at the Bicentenanial Generation finale with Tatiana as the host. On 22 February 2012, Tatiana announced on her twitcam that the show was officially cancelled due to production issues. On 11 July 2013, it was confirmed that La Academia Kids was in production again. Ingrid Coronado returned as the host, joined by Mauricio Barcelata and Mariana Torres. Alicia Villarreal, Lola Cortés and Luis Coronel serve as judges. On 31 August, the show aired a casting special, while the first live concert took place on 7 September, and the finale was held on 21 December, where the winner received MX$500,000.

Adamaris, Cristopher, Eddy, Michelle, Nahomy & Ximena reached the finale. Eddy Valenzuela''' was declared the first winner of La Academia Kids.

KIDS: Season 2 (2014)

Due to the high ratings Azteca producer Roberto Romagnoli confirmed a second season of the kids version. On 25 July 2014, it was confirmed that Ingrid Coronado will return as the host, joined by Mariana Torres and Carlos Arenas. While Alicia Villarreal, Lolita Cortés, and First Generations second place, Víctor García will serve as judges. The season premiered on 16 August with a two-week casting special episodes, the first live concert took place on 30 August.

Angélica, Alexis, Karla, Nicole, Sarah & Sofía reached the finale. Karla Herrarte was declared the second winner of La Academia Kids, making her the first foreigner to ever win a season of the show.

Notable careers
La Academia has been the most important reality show of Azteca, but not all of the contestants have transcended to a successful career. There are some examples of former La Academia contestants, that have been constantly on the public eye:

 Carlos Rivera, was the winner of The Third Generation, and decided to switch from a singing career to musical theater. He has done five plays, one of them being The Lion King Musical in Spain which got him international recognition. Since 2015 he joined Azteca's rival network, Televisa. He plays in El hotel de los secretos ("The Hotel of Secrets"), a Mexican soap-opera based the Spanish TV series Gran Hotel. In 2018, he became one of the 4 coaches of the Mexican version of The Voices 7th season, produced by Televisa. His latest album Guerra has been a worldwide success, topping the charts all around the world. Rivera has collaborated with artists including the late Juan Gabriel, Thalía, José José, Pandora, Reyli Barba, Ana Torroja, Marta Sánchez, Franco De Vita, Ana Carolina and Daniel Boaventura, Paulo Gonzo, Abel Pintos, and India Martínez. 
 Yuridia, earned the second place of The Fourth Generation, and has recorded 7 albums including a Primera Fila: Desierto, they have managed to sell 3.5 million copies in Latin America and have received Gold, Platinum and even Diamond certifications.
 Melissa Barrera, earned the eighteenth place of The 2011 Generation. From 2012 to 2015 she starred in four telenovelas produced by TV Azteca. In 2018, it was announced that she had been cast as Lyn Hernandez on the new Starz show, Vida, which was renewed for a third season less than a week after the second season's debut. In April 2019, it was announced that Barrera would be starring as Vanessa in the 2020 film adaptation of Lin-Manuel Miranda's Tony Award-winning musical In The Heights.
 Yahir was part of The First Generation of this reality, and so far he has been one of the contestants with the most achievements, he has starred in soap-operas and recorded albums which garnered different recognitions.
 María Inés Guerra, released only one album after her participation in La Academia. Instead, she kept going as an acknowledged host of important television shows in  Azteca, furthermore she was the main antagonist of the 2003 soap opera Enamórate and hosted shows for other networks like Glitz, E! Entertainment Television and Disney Channel.
 Nadia was the fifth place of The First Generation, and her 2003 album received Gold and Platinum recognitions, as well as having her duet with Yahir, Contigo Si, on the top charts for 24 weeks. She has recorded several albums in different genres, and one of them earned a Grammy nomination, in addition to 3 Gold and 1 Platinum certifications.
 Myriam was the first winner of the reality show, and has sold many records throughout her career. Her discography has received Gold and Platinum certifications.

The following table lists the top 10 most followed accounts on Instagram.

The following table lists the top 10 most followed accounts on Twitter.

The following table lists the top 10 most viewed performances on YouTube.

The following table lists the top 10 most viewed music videos on YouTube.

The following table lists the top 5 most popular songs of the show.

The following table lists the top 10 best selling albums according to AMPROFON.

The following table lists the viewership ranking of all seasons. 

Tours

Spin-offs

Desafio De Estrellas (2003, 2006, 2009)Desafío de Estrellas is a Mexican musical show produced and distributed by Azteca, the second most important network in the country. The format of the Desafío is similar to American Idol with contestants eliminated every week and a grand finale with the top contestants competing to win the first place prize. Azteca has, until 2006, produced two versions of the program, one in 2003 and the other in 2006. 
The 2003 version consisted only of former contestants of La Academia, another Azteca-produced show which had already garnished two seasons and, in the process, taken away rating from Televisa, the prime network of the country.
The 2006 version, on the other hand, consisted of both former contestants of La Academia (all four seasons), as well as other artists produced by Azteca in the middle and late 90s.
Later in 2009 a third season took place with former contestants of the six seasons of la academia.

Homenaje a...(2003)Tribute to... placed season 1 and 2 contestants against each other each Sunday to compete for MX$100,000.

Segunda Oportunidad (2010)Second Chance'' premiered on 21 March 2010. This show featured former contestants from seasons 1 to 7 who competed for a second chance at the competition and the music industry. The show featured 53 contestants from the 7 generations of "La Academia" and "La Academia USA". On 4 March, 50 contestants were announced, the other two will be chosen by voters on the internet. On 10 March, they announced the composition of 13 teams of four members each.

International versions

See also
 La academia 5.
 La academia USA.
 Akademi Fantasia.
 Academy Fantasia.
 Akademi Fantasi Indosiar.
 Desafio de Estrellas.

References

 
Television series by TV Azteca